Hamza Hadi  is a former Iraqi football defender who played for the Iraq in the 2000 Asian Cup. He also played for Al-Talaba, Al-Quwa Al-Jawiya, Dibba Al-Fujairah, Al-Shorta, and Al-Sinaa

Hamza Hadi was a member of the Iraqi Under-20s that took part at the 1989 World Youth Cup in Saudi Arabia winning their group. The team lost 2-1 to the United States in the quarter-finals.

Hamza was called into the national team by Adnan Hamad at the age of 30 to play in the 2000 West-Asian Championship in Amman to replace the retired Radhi Shenaishel.

He scored a stunning 25-yard goal against Jordan, which won him an award for the best goal at the tournament.

In the semi-final, he had  missed the all-important penalty in the 4-3 penalty shoot-out defeat by Syria.

He was one of many players criticised for the 4-1 defeat by Japan at the 2000 Asian Cup, Hamza kept his place until Milan Zivadinovic was sacked and new coach Adnan Hamad dropped him.

Career statistics

International goals
Scores and results list Iraq's goal tally first.

Managerial statistics

References

External links
 
 11v11 Profile

Iraqi footballers
Al-Talaba SC players
Iraq international footballers
2000 AFC Asian Cup players
Living people
1969 births
Place of birth missing (living people)
Al-Shorta SC players
Al-Sinaa SC players
Al-Quwa Al-Jawiya players
dibba FC players
Association football defenders